Luis Eduardo Lora is a Colombian football player who currently plays for Deportivo Pasto in Colombia.

External links
 BDFA profile

Living people
1986 births
Colombian people of Spanish descent
Colombian footballers
Categoría Primera A players
Categoría Primera B players
Deportivo Pasto footballers
Association football defenders